William Hose Flores Sr. (born February 25, 1954) is an American businessman and politician who was the U.S. representative for  from 2011 to 2021. The district, located in the middle of the state, includes Waco, College Station, and Bryan. He is a member of the Republican Party and the former chief executive officer of Phoenix Exploration Company, an oil and natural gas company. Flores currently serves as Vice Chair of the Electric Reliability Council of Texas (ERCOT).

Flores chose not to seek re-election in 2020 after five terms in office. He was succeeded by former U.S. Representative for  Congressman Pete Sessions.

Early life and education

Flores was born in Cheyenne, Wyoming, at the F.E. Warren Air Force Base, where his father was serving in the military. He is the son of Ruth Ann Theresa (née Kennedy) and Joe Pete Flores. He grew up in Stratford in the Texas Panhandle. His paternal ancestors left Spain and settled in what is now Texas in 1725. Of his heritage, Flores has said, "My family came from Spain in 1725, and if people want to consider me Hispanic, they can, but I didn't advertise that way, and I'm an American first." He graduated with a BBA, cum laude in accounting from Texas A&M University in 1976. While there, he was a member of the Corps of Cadets, the MSC Student Conference on National Affairs, the Ross Volunteer Company, and Corps Staff. He also served as Student Body Vice-President of Finance during his senior year. He has been a licensed Certified Public Accountant since 1978. He also received a Master of Business Administration from Houston Baptist University in 1985.

Business career
Flores served as the chief financial officer (CFO) for two publicly traded energy service firms from 1990 through 1998: Marine Drilling Companies, Inc. (1990–1997) and Western Atlas Inc. (1997–1998). From 2002 to 2005, Flores was the Senior Vice President and CFO of Gryphon Exploration Company.

In 2006, a group of five oil and gas industry executives, led by Flores as president and CEO, formed Phoenix Exploration Company with $350 million of capital commitments from a group of private equity firms that included Riverstone Holdings and Pinebrook Partners. The company was engaged in oil and gas exploration along the Gulf Coast and the Gulf of Mexico. Flores also served as a director of that company from its formation until he retired in December 2009 to run for public office.

Flores is a former commissioner of the Texas Real Estate Commission (appointed by Governor Rick Perry), and a past director and former chairman of the board of the Association of Former Students of Texas A&M University. He has also served on boards of Phoenix Exploration Company, Marine Drilling Companies, Inc., FreeBirds, Inc., and The PARC, Inc, and the Alley Theater of Houston.

He serves on the board of the Private Enterprise Research Center of Texas A&M University and as a member of the board of trustees of Houston Baptist University, where he serves as vice-chairman.

U.S. House of Representatives

2010 election

In late 2009 Flores entered the Republican primary for the 17th District, held by 10-term Democratic incumbent Chet Edwards. Flores claimed his worries about the future of "the American dream" inspired him to run for Congress. He committed a half million dollars of his own money to self-fund his campaign.

In the Republican primary runoff on April 13, he had defeated Rob Curnock by a 64–36 percent margin. The size of his primary victory was a surprise to many political observers because Curnock was the 2008 nominee and he held Edwards' 2008 vote total close to 50 percent, despite being heavily outspent. During the Republican primary, Flores received the endorsement of former Republican U.S. Senator Phil Gramm After the primary win, Flores was also endorsed by George H. W. Bush, John McCain, Mitt Romney, and Mike Huckabee.

Through December 21, 2010, Flores' campaign raised $3.5 million, of which $1.49 million came from Flores himself. He spent $3.3 million overall.

On November 2, 2010, Flores defeated Edwards with 62 percent of the vote. This was the largest margin of defeat for a Democratic incumbent in the 2010 cycle.

Flores won his fourth term in the U.S. House in the general election held on November 8, 2016. With 149,417 votes (60.8 percent), he defeated Democrat William Matta, who trailed with 86,603 ballots (35.2 percent) and Libertarian Clark Patterson with 9,708 (4 percent).

Flores won his fifth term in the U.S. House in the general election held on November 6, 2018. With 134,375 votes (56.9 percent), he defeated Democrat Rick Kennedy, who trailed with 97,574 ballots (41.3 percent) and Libertarian Peter Churchman with 4,415 (1.9 percent).

Political positions
Upon his swearing-in, Flores became the first Republican to represent Waco in Congress since Reconstruction. Flores supports limited government and lower taxes; an end to the spending of the American Recovery and Reinvestment Act; making the Bush-era tax cuts permanent; anti-abortion positions; and stronger enforcement at the U.S. Mexico border. Flores supports the building of new nuclear power plants to assist the U.S. in becoming energy self-sufficient. He also supports incentives for the development of solar and wind power. Flores is a member of the Conservative Republican Study Committee and the Congressional Hispanic Conference.

National security

Flores supported President Donald Trump's 2017 executive order to temporarily curtail Muslim immigration until better screening methods are devised. He stated that "Taking 120-day breath to evaluate the effectiveness of our vetting program is a smart thing to do."

Texas v. Pennsylvania
In December 2020, Flores was one of 126 Republican members of the House of Representatives who signed an amicus brief in support of Texas v. Pennsylvania, a lawsuit filed at the United States Supreme Court contesting the results of the 2020 presidential election, in which Joe Biden prevailed over incumbent Donald Trump. The Supreme Court declined to hear the case on the basis that Texas lacked standing under Article III of the Constitution to challenge the results of the election held by another state.

Republican Study Committee
On November 18, 2014, Flores was elected to the Chairmanship of the House Republican Study Committee. Flores was elected on the second ballot, securing 84 votes to South Carolina Representative Mick Mulvaney's 57.

Committee assignments
 Committee on Energy and Commerce
 Subcommittee on Energy and Power
 Subcommittee on Environment and the Economy
 Subcommittee on Oversight and Investigation
 Committee on Veterans' Affairs
 Subcommittee on Economic Opportunity
 Subcommittee on Health

Caucus memberships
 House Baltic Caucus
Congressional Western Caucus
Veterinary Medicine Caucus
Congressional Hispanic Conference

Legislation sponsored
 On July 18, 2013, Flores introduced the Protecting States’ Rights to Promote American Energy Security Act (H.R. 2728; 113th Congress). The bill would require the federal government to defer to individual states about regulations governing hydraulic fracturing. It passed the House of Representatives on November 20, 2013.

Personal life
Flores is married to Gina, whom he met in high school. They have two sons. Flores attends Central Church, a church in Bryan.

Flores has served as a member of the Mays Business School Advisory Board, the Corps of Cadets Development Council, Corps of Cadets Association, the Houston A&M Club, the Brazos County A&M Club, and other roles at Texas A&M University. In 2003, he was honored as an outstanding alumnus of the Mays Business School of Texas A&M University. In 2010, he was also recognized as a 'Distinguished Alumnus' by Texas A&M University. In November 2021, Flores began serving on the board of ERCOT as Vice Chair.

Blocking constituents on social media
During his tenure in Congress, Flores had blocked constituents from contacting him through social media. “I can’t correspond with him and I can’t interact with him,” said one of Flores' constituents.

Electoral history

See also
List of Hispanic and Latino Americans in the United States Congress

References

External links
 
 
 

|-

|-

1954 births
21st-century American politicians
American businesspeople in the oil industry
American people of Spanish descent
Businesspeople from Houston
Hispanic and Latino American members of the United States Congress
Houston Christian University alumni
Living people
People from Bryan, Texas
People from College Station, Texas
Politicians from Houston
People from Sherman County, Texas
Politicians from Cheyenne, Wyoming
Republican Party members of the United States House of Representatives from Texas
Southern Baptists
Texas A&M University alumni